Scott Guberman is an American keyboardist best known for his work with founding Grateful Dead bassist, Phil Lesh. After relocating to the Bay Area from the East Coast In 2015, Guberman was asked to join Phil Lesh's band "Communion". He now plays regularly as a member of Phil Lesh & Friends and with Lesh in other formations at Terrapin Crossroads.

Background 
Guberman began playing piano at the age of 5. During his high school years, Guberman began experimenting with synthesizers and electric pianos.  During this time, Guberman began playing in rock bands regularly.

After high school, Guberman attended The Hartt School of Music where he studied classical piano.

Guberman gained recognition amongst The Grateful Dead community in the early 2000s while playing Hammond organ regularly with Rock & Roll Hall of Famer and former Grateful Dead keyboardist, Tom Constanten. During this time, Guberman also toured with Vince Welnick, The Grateful Dead's final keyboardist.  Guberman toured throughout the East Coast with The Vince Welnick Band from 2003-2006.

References

External links
Official website

American rock keyboardists
Living people
American male organists
1971 births
21st-century American keyboardists
21st-century organists
21st-century American male musicians
American organists